Central Atlas Tamazight (also referred to as just Tamazight) belongs to the Northern Berber branch of the Berber languages.

As a member of the Afroasiatic family, Tamazight grammar has a two-gender (tawsit) system, VSO typology, emphatic consonants (realized in Tamazight as velarized), and a templatic morphology.

Tamazight has a verbo-nominal distinction, with adjectives being a subset of verbs.

Nouns 

Nouns may be masculine or feminine and singular or plural. Definiteness is not marked (even though many loanwords from Arabic contain what was originally the Arabic definite article). In Ayt Seghrouchen initial /a/ is dropped in many singular nouns, though their plurals and construct states are similar to Ayt Ayache.

Plurals may either involve a regular change ("sound plurals"), internal vowel change ("broken plurals"), or a combination of the two. Some plurals are mixed, e.g.  ('hand') >  ('hands').

This suffix undergoes the following assimilatory rules:

  >  (in AA and AS)
  >  (only AA)
  > ) (only AA) 

"Sound" plurals usually take  and "Broken" plurals .

Examples:.
 /axam/-/ixamn/ 'big tent(s)' (m)
 /amaziɣ/-/imaziɣn/ '' (m)
 /adaʃu//-/iduʃa/ 'sandal(s)' (m)
 /asrdun/-/isrdan/ '' (m)
 /taxamt/-/tixamin/ 'tent(s)' (f)
 /tafunast/-/tifunasin/ '' (f)
 /tagrtilt/-/tigrtal/ 'mat(s)' (f)
 /tamazirt/-/timizar/ '' (f)

Nouns may be put into the construct state (contrasting with free state) to indicate possession, or when the subject of a verb follows the verb. This is also used for nouns following numerals and some prepositions (note that , 'to', only requires this for feminine nouns), as well as the word  ('and'). The construct state is formed as follows:

 In masculine nouns:
 Initial  > 
 Initial  > 
 Initial  > 
 In feminine nouns:
 Initial  >  or rarely 
 Initial  >  or rarely 
 Initial  >  

Examples (in AA):
  (< ) 'head of the house'
  (< ) 'the horse of the bride'

Pronouns 
Tamazight's use of possessive suffixes mirrors that of many other Afroasiatic languages.

 of verbs and prepositions
 whether objective pronouns are prefixed or suffixed is determined by various factors
 -inw is used when the noun ends in a consonant
These mutate after  (e.g. in ).

Ayt Seghrouchen also has a special set of suffixes for future transitive verbs (which combine with the future marker ):

('mine').

Special possessive suffixes are used with kinship terms.

Emphatics are formed with the word , e.g.  ('I myself').

 Ayt Ayache
 Ayt Seghrouchen

('this pack-saddle').

Other deictic suffixes:  ('this'),  ('that'), e.g.  ('this house'),  ('that house').

Verbs 

Verbs are marked for tense, aspect, mode, voice, and polarity, and agree with the number, person, and gender of the subject.

Verb framing

Satellite framing is accomplished with the proximate affix /d/ (/dː/ in AS) and remote /nː/, e.g. /dːu/ 'to go' yields /i-dːa/ 'he went', /i-dːa-d/ 'he came', /i-dːa-nː/ 'he went there' (in AS the verb /rˠaħ/ 'to go' is used instead)

Voice

Derived verb stems may be made from basic verb stems to create causatives, reciprocals, recipro-causatives, passives, or habituals.

Causatives are derived from unaugmented stems with the prefix /s(ː)-/.
/ħudr/ 'bend' > /sħudr/

Habituals are derived from unaugmented and reciprocal/recipro-causative stems with the prefix /tː-/ (sometimes with internal change), from causatives by an infixed vowel, and from passives by an optional infixed vowel:
/fa/ 'yawn' > /tːfa/
(/ħudr/ 'bend' >) /sħudr/ > /sħudur/
(/ʕum/ 'swim' > /mːsʕum/ >) /tːmːsʕum/
(/bdr/ 'mention' > /tːubdr/ >) /tːubdar/

Reciprocals are formed with the prefix /m(ː)-/, and recipro-causatives with /-m(ː)s-/, sometimes with internal change.
 /sal/ 'ask' > /mːsal/

Passives are formed with the prefix /tːu-/:
/ħnːa/ 'pity' > /tːuħnːa/

Tense, mode, and subject

 marks future tense,  marks interrogative mode, and  marks negative mode.

Pronominal complement markers cliticize to the verb, with the indirect object preceding the direct object, e.g. /izn-as-t/ "he sold it to him".

Central Atlas Tamazight uses a bipartite negative construction (e.g. /uriffiɣ ʃa/ 'he didn't go out') which apparently was modeled after proximate Arabic varieties, in a common development known as Jespersen's Cycle. This is a phenomenon where a postverbal item is reanalyzed as being an element of a discontinuous negation marker composed of it and the preverbal negation marker. It is present in multiple Berber varieties, and is argued to have originated in neighboring Arabic and been adopted by contact.

Standard negation is accompanied by a negative indefinite pronoun, walu.

Tamazight has a null copula. The words   'to be, to do' may function as a copula in Ayt Ayache and Ayt Seghrouchen respectively, especially in structures preceded by /aj/ 'who, which, what'.

Many Arabic loans have been integrated into the Tamazight verb lexicon. They adhere fully to patterns of native stems, and may even undergo ablaut.

Ablaut

In Ayt Ayache, ablaut occurs only in affirmative and/or negative past (in applicable verb classes). Types of ablaut include Ø:i/a,  Ø:i, and a:u, which may be accompanied by metathesis. In Ayt Seghrouchen types of ablaut include Ø:i (in negative), i/a, i/u, a-u, and a-i.

Adjectives 

Adjectives come after the noun they modify, and inflect for number and gender:

 /argaz amʕdur/ 'the foolish man' (lit. 'man foolish')
 /tamtˤot tamʕdurt/ 'the foolish woman' 
 /irgzen imʕdar/ 'the foolish men'
 /tajtʃin timʕdar/ 'the foolish women'

Adjectives may also occur alone, in which case they become an NP.

Practically all adjectives also have a verbal form used for predicative purposes, which behaves just like a normal verb:
 /i-mmuʕdr urgaz/ 'the man is foolish' (lit. '3ps-foolish man')
 /argaz i-mmuʕdr-n/ 'the foolish man' [using a non-finite verb]

As such, adjectives may be classed as a subset of verbs which also have other non-verbal features. However Penchoen (1973:21) argues that they are actually nouns.

Particles 

Prepositions

These may take pronominal suffixes (see Pronouns).

Some prepositions require the following noun to be in the construct state, while others do not.

 encliticizes onto the following word (which is put into construct state), and assimilates to some initial consonants: it becomes  before a noun with initial ,  before initial , and  before initial  (note that this creates geminates rather than doubled phonemes, e.g.  'some milk'). Nouns with initial  normally drop in when following  'some of', e.g.  (< ||) 'some meat', but some don't, following the normal rules of construct state, e.g.  (< ||) 'some tea'.

Conjunctions

The conjunction  'and' requires construct state, and also assimilates to a following , e.g.  'the donkey and the cow'.

Other conjunctions include:

Numerals 

Cardinal numerals

The first few (1–3 in Ayt Ayache, 1–2 in Ayt Seghrouchen) cardinal numerals have native Berber and borrowed Arabic forms. The Arabic numerals are only used for counting in order and for production of higher numbers when combined with the tens.

All higher cardinals are borrowed from Arabic. This is consistent with the linguistic universals that the numbers 1–3 are much more likely to be retained, and that a borrowed number generally implies that numbers greater than it are also borrowed. The retention of one is also motivated by the fact that Berber languages near-universally use unity as a determiner.

('7 years'; without the preposition ).

Cardinal numbers precede the modified noun, connected by the preposition  (optional for the number 1).

('one boy'),  ('one girl'),  ('two rials').

Nouns following numerals require construct state.

Ordinal numerals

The word for 'the first' is unique in that it is not derived from a cardinal stem and it inflects for number:

Fractions

There are unique words which may be used for some fractions, although male ordinals can be used for 1/4 on.

  may be used in both Ayt Ayache and Ayt Seghrouchen, while  is specific to the latter

Syntax 
Word order is usually Verb + Subject [in construct state] but sometimes is Subject [in free state] + Verb, e.g. ( vs.  'the Berber went out'). Tamazight exhibits pro-drop behavior.

Questions

wh- questions are always clefts, and multiple wh-questions are not found. This means that Tamazight cannot grammatically express an equivalent to the English "who saw what?".

Tamazight's clefting, relativisation, and wh-interrogation cause what is called "anti-agreement effects", similarly to Shilha. This is when the verb doesn't agree with or agrees in a special way with wh-words. In Berber, the feminine singular prefix  disappears when the subject is a wh- phrase, but only for affirmative verbs.

Notes

References

Bibliography 
 
 
 
 
 

Afroasiatic grammars
Berber languages
Languages of Morocco